Keaweʻīkekahialiʻiokamoku (c. 1660 – c. 1725) was the king of Hawaiʻi Island in the late 17th century. He was the great-grandfather of Kamehameha I, the first King of the Kingdom of Hawaii.

He was a progenitor of the House of Keawe.

Biography 
Keawe was believed to have lived from 1660 to 1725. He was son of Keakealaniwahine, the ruling Queen of Hawaii and Kanaloakapulehu. He is sometimes referred to as King Keawe II, since prior to him his ancestor was Keawe-nui-a-'Umi. Keawe was surnamed "ʻīkekahialiʻiokamoku".

Keaweʻīkekahialiʻiokamoku, a strong leader, ruled over much of the Big Island except district of Hilo which was still independent. He is said to have been an enterprising and stirring chief, who traveled all over the eight islands, and obtained a reputation for bravery and prudent management of his island. It appears that in some manner he composed the troubles that had disturbed the peace during his mother's time; mainly the conflict between the independent ʻI family of Hilo. It was not by force or by conquest, for in that case, and so near to our times, some traces of it would certainly have been preserved in the legends. He probably accomplished the tranquility of the island through diplomacy, as he himself married Lonomaʻaikanaka, the daughter of Ahu-a-ʻI, and he afterwards married his son Kalaninuiomamao to Ahia, the granddaughter of Kuaʻana-a-ʻI and cousin to Kuahuia's son, Mokulani, and thus by this double marriage securing the peace and allegiance of the Hilo chiefs. The other districts do not seem to have shared in the resistance made by the Hilo chiefs to the authority of the King, at least the name of no district chief of note or influence has been recorded as having been so engaged.

He ruled along with his half-sister wife Kalanikauleleiaiwi who inherited their mother kapu rank. After his death, a civil war broke out over succession between his sons, Keʻeaumoku and Kalaninuiʻamamao, and a rival chief known as Alapaʻinui, who was the son of his sister Kalanikauleleiaiwi and Kauakahilau-a-Mahi, son of Chief Mahiolole (Mahiololi) of the Kohala district,. Alapaʻinui emerged victorious over the two brothers and their orphan sons (including Kamehameha I's father), who were absorbed into his clan. Hale o Keawe was an ancient Hawaiian heiau originally built as the burial site for  Keaweʻīkekahialiʻiokamoku. Today the reconstructed temple is part of the Puʻuhonua o Hōnaunau National Historical Park.

The House of Kalākaua and the House of Kawānanakoa descend from his eldest son Kalaninuiʻamamao. He could be called the father of Hawaii.

Ancestry

References 

Royalty of Hawaii (island)
House of Keawe
1665 births
1725 deaths
Burials at the Royal Mausoleum (Mauna ʻAla)
17th-century monarchs in Oceania
18th-century monarchs in Oceania
House of Līloa
Hawaiian monarchs